Will Never Die is the second studio album by American crunkcore band Brokencyde, released on November 9, 2010 through BreakSilence Recordings.

Reception

Dave Wedge, writing for the Boston Herald, referred to the album as a "snotty, ADD-riddled batch of Auto-Tuned crunkcore", singling out "the painfully embarrassing ballad 'My Gurl' and the bad reggae of 'High Timez'."

Track listing

"Hot Topic Bonus House Party Scream-Along" version

Personnel
 Tom Baker – mastering
 Raymond Brown – CD art and layout
 Beth Chapin – guest vocals on "Teach Me How to Scream"
 Mike Kumagai – production, mixing
 Brandon Turner – photography
 Brad Xavier – executive producer
 Kevin Zinger – executive producer

Brokencyde
 Se7en – screamed vocals, rap vocals, production
 Mikl – clean vocals
 Phat J – keyboards, synthesizers, programming, death growl, rap vocals
 Antz – rhythm production, beats

References

2010 albums
Brokencyde albums